Vanesa Furlanetto and Amandine Hesse were the defending champions, but both players chose not to come back this year. Furlanetto competed in Denain and Hesse at the Reinert Open.

Alexandra Panova and Laura Thorpe won the tournament after Irina-Camelia Begu and María Irigoyen were forced to retire in the second set, with the final score of 6–3, 4–0, ret.

Seeds

Draw

References 
 Draw

Lorraine Open 88 - Doubles